"" (English: "Let no one sleep") is an aria from the final act of Giacomo Puccini's opera Turandot (text by Giuseppe Adami and Renato Simoni) and one of the best-known tenor arias in all opera. It is sung by Calaf,  (the unknown prince), who falls in love at first sight with the beautiful but cold Princess Turandot. Any man who wishes to wed Turandot must first answer her three riddles; if he fails, he will be beheaded. In the aria, Calaf expresses his triumphant assurance that he will win the princess.

Although "Nessun dorma" had long been a staple of operatic recitals, Luciano Pavarotti popularised the piece beyond the opera world in the 1990s following his performance of it for the 1990 FIFA World Cup, which captivated a global audience. Both Pavarotti and Plácido Domingo released singles of the aria, with Pavarotti's reaching number 2 in the UK, and it appeared on the best selling classical album of all time, The Three Tenors in Concert. The Three Tenors, which includes José Carreras, performed the aria at three subsequent FIFA World Cup Finals, in 1994 in Los Angeles, 1998 in Paris, and 2002 in Yokohama. Since 1990, many crossover artists have performed and recorded it. The aria has been sung often in films and on television.

Context and analysis 
In the act before this aria, Calaf has correctly answered the three riddles put to all of Princess Turandot's prospective suitors. Nonetheless, she recoils at the thought of marriage to him. Calaf offers her another chance by challenging her to guess his name by dawn. As he kneels before her, the "Nessun dorma" theme makes a first appearance, to his words, "" (My name you do not know!). She can execute him if she correctly guesses his name; but if she does not, she must marry him. The cruel and emotionally cold princess then decrees that none of her subjects shall sleep that night until his name is discovered. If they fail, all will be killed.

As the final act opens, it is now night. Calaf is alone in the moonlit palace gardens. In the distance, he hears Turandot's heralds proclaiming her command. His aria begins with an echo of their cry and a reflection on Princess Turandot:

{|
|
|style="padding-left:2em;"|None shall sleep! None shall sleep!
Not even you, oh Princess,
in your cold bedroom,
watching the stars
that tremble with love, and with hope!
|-
|
|style="padding-left:2em;"|But my secret is hidden within me;
no one will know my name!
No, no! On your mouth,
I will say it when the light shines!
|-
|
|style="padding-left:2em;"|And my kiss will dissolve
the silence that makes you mine!
|}

Just before the climactic end of the aria, a chorus of women is heard singing in the distance:

{|
|
|style="padding-left:3em;"|No one will know his name,
and we will have to, alas, die, die!
|}

Calaf, now certain of victory, sings:
{|
|
|style="padding-left:10em;"|Vanish, o night!
Fade, you stars!
Fade, you stars!
At dawn, I will win!
I will win! I will win!
|}

Just before the extra climactic end of the aria, a chorus of women is heard singing in the distance again:
{|
|
|style="padding-left:11em;"|Or sun! Life! Eternity!
Light of the world is love!
|}

Calaf, now certain of glory, sings:
{|
|
|style="padding-left:12em;"|Laugh and sing in the sun
Our infinite happiness!
Glory to you! Glory to you!
|}

In performance, the final "Vincerò!" features a sustained B, followed by the final note, an A sustained even longer—although Puccini's score did not explicitly specify that either note be sustained. In the original score, the B is written as a sixteenth note while the A is a whole note. Both are high notes in the tenor range. The only recording to follow Puccini's score exactly was the first, sung by Gina Cigna and Francesco Merli, conducted by Franco Ghione.

In Alfano's completion of act 3, the "Nessun dorma" theme makes a final triumphal appearance at the end of the opera. The theme also makes a concluding reappearance in Luciano Berio's later completion (this having been an expressed intention of Puccini's), but in a more subdued orchestration.

Recordings

"Nessun dorma", sung by some of the most famous interpreters of Calaf, appears on the following compilation recordings. (For full-length recordings of the opera, see Turandot discography.)
 The Very Best of Beniamino Gigli (EMI Classics)
 The Very Best of Jussi Björling (EMI Classics)
 Richard Tucker in Recital (Columbia Masterworks/Myto)
 The Very Best of Franco Corelli (EMI Classics)
 Pavarotti Forever (Decca)
 The Essential Plácido Domingo (Deutsche Grammophon)

Cultural references and adaptations

Luciano Pavarotti
"Nessun dorma" achieved pop status after Luciano Pavarotti's 1972 recording of it was used as the theme song of BBC television's coverage of the 1990 FIFA World Cup in Italy. It subsequently reached no. 2 on the UK Singles Chart. Although Pavarotti rarely sang the role of Calaf on stage, "Nessun dorma" became his signature aria and a sporting anthem in its own right, especially for football. Pavarotti notably sang the aria during the first Three Tenors concert on the eve of the 1990 FIFA World Cup Final in Rome. For an encore, he performed the aria again, taking turns with José Carreras and Plácido Domingo. The image of three tenors in full formal dress singing in a World Cup concert captivated the global audience. The album of the concert achieved triple platinum record status in the United States alone and went on to outsell all other classical recordings worldwide. The number became a regular feature of subsequent Three Tenors concerts, and they performed it at three subsequent FIFA World Cup Finals, in 1994 in Los Angeles, 1998 in Paris, and 2002 in Yokohama.

Pavarotti gave a rendition of "Nessun dorma" at his final performance, the finale of the 2006 Winter Olympics opening ceremony, although it was later revealed that he had lip-synched the specially pre-recorded performance (at the time of his Winter Olympics appearance, Pavarotti was physically incapable of performing, as he was suffering from pancreatic cancer, to which he succumbed the following year). His Decca recording of the aria was played at his funeral during the flypast by the Italian Air Force. In 2013, the track was certified gold by the Federation of the Italian Music Industry.

Crossover and adapted versions

"Nessun dorma" (often in adapted versions of the score) has been performed by many pop and crossover singers and instrumentalists.
 The 1989 song "A Love So Beautiful", co-written by Roy Orbison and Jeff Lynne, borrows the aria's melody.
 In what the National Academy of Recording Arts and Sciences called "the greatest last-second substitution act in Grammy history", Aretha Franklin sang a "soul-infused" version of the aria in place of Luciano Pavarotti when throat problems caused him to withdraw from the 1998 Grammy Awards show.
 The 2002 album Warriors of the World by the band Manowar features a version of the aria.
 In 2004 Ruggero Scandiuzzi inserts his version in the album Io le canto così (I sing them like this) (Joker, MC 20089).
 In 2007, Chris Botti recorded a trumpet version of "Nessun dorma" for his album Italia.
 Anohni, lead singer of Antony and the Johnsons, recorded the aria with the Orchestra Roma Sinfonietta, as part of an advertising campaign for the Italian coffee company Lavazza in 2009.
 Jeff Beck's 2010 album, Emotion & Commotion, includes an instrumental version of this aria where the guitar takes the place of the human voice to an orchestral accompaniment.
 Jennifer Hudson sang the aria with the New York Philharmonic at the "We Love NYC: The Homecoming Concert" in Central Park on August 21, 2021.

In other media
"Nessun dorma" has been used in many films, often appearing at a central moment in the film—sometimes with the aria's moment of musical resolution aligned with the film's narrative climax, giving symbolic meaning to the aria's rich emotional impact.

Films in which the aria plays a significant role in the soundtrack include The Killing Fields, New York Stories, The Sea Inside, The Sum of All Fears, The Mirror Has Two Faces, Bend It Like Beckham, Chasing Liberty, No Reservations, The Upside, and Mission: Impossible – Rogue Nation (with the scene set within a performance of Turandot itself). It was also used in a climactic scene of the first season of Daredevil. It was sung by Pavarotti himself as part of his fictional role in the film Yes, Giorgio. "Nessun dorma" is also the title of a short film by Ken Russell included in the 1987 film Aria.

"Nessun dorma" has also accompanied climactic scenes in various television shows. For example, the piece is played at the conclusion of episode 4 of the Korean drama Vincenzo. The aria is seemingly being broadcast over the radio, and the episode ends dramatically with the titular character speaking the final words of the song as Pavarotti sings them, “Tramontate, stelle! All'alba vincerò! Vincerò! Vincerò!”

Nessun dorma is the title of a football podcast, hosted by The Guardian journalist Lee Calvert and featuring sports writers past and present, that celebrates 1980s and 1990s football.

References

External links 
 
  (official channel of Warner Classics)

1926 compositions
Arias by Giacomo Puccini
Opera excerpts
Compositions in G major 
Compositions in D major 

FIFA World Cup songs
Tenor arias
Arias in Italian